Anigraea cinctipalpis is a moth of the family Noctuidae first described by Francis Walker in 1865. It is found in Indian subregion, Sri Lanka, Malaysia, Borneo, Philippines, New Guinea and Australia.

It is a pest of Anacardium occidentale.

References

Moths of Asia
Moths described in 1865
Euteliinae